Field Hockey at the 2022 South American Youth Games was held from 5 to 8 May. The events took place at the Hipódromo de Rosario in Rosario, Argentina. The format for this event was Hockey 5s, a 5-a-side tournament that is played on a smaller field size.

Medal summary

Medal table
The results were as follows:

Medalists

References

2022 South American Youth Games
South American Youth Game
2022 South American Youth Games